David Vostell (born 10 October 1960) is a German-Spanish composer and film director.

Biography 
David Vostell was born in Cologne, the first child of Wolf Vostell and his Spanish wife Mercedes Guardado. His father and his father's art have formed his view of the world from his earliest childhood onwards. The artistics movements of the 1960s and the early 1970s as well as his father's circle with people as Nam June Paik and Allan Kaprow, with whom he often sat together as a teenager, marked him deeply.

From 1977 until 1980 he made apprenticeships at the TV and radio station Sender Freies Berlin, as well as at the publicity agency TBWA in Frankfurt am Main. He worked as an assistant film editor, as a film projectionist, in a photolab, in a photostudio and as photographer. In 1979, together with some of his former school mates, he made 36574 Bilder (36574 Images), an experimental film in Super 8. In 1980 he shot the documentary Endogen Depression about the making of an Installation by Wolf Vostell.

In 1982 he shot the short film Ginger Hel starring Mark Eins, founder of the band Din A Testbild, and with the actress Panterra Hamm. The film tells a bizarre love story set in the Berlin underground movement. In Norse mythology Hel is the name for both the netherworld and its goddess. This allusion to mythology is conveyed in some scenes of the film by the roles of the actors as they blur into mythological figures. From his early short films onwards, his special affinity for music is in evidence. The film is marked by long, rhythmic passages of music, long shots and action and dialogue between the actors which are reduced to elementary scenes. This creates an idiom in which the music accompanies the scenes and is on equal terms with the images.

In the years between 1985 and 1987, he produced 7 music videos. David Vostell's music videos are far from the technical perfection of music videos of the 1980s. His music videos are an experimental mixture of pictures and music. Blurred, uneasy and repetitive shots form a characteristic trait with a style of its own, which breaks with all conventions.
In 1990 David Vostell directed the feature film The Being from Earth in Los Angeles. This feature, with German title Das Wesen der Erde, tells the fantastic story of a being, a mixture between animal and plant, born out of the sands of the Mojave desert. The film title alludes mainly to this being born from earth, but it can also be seen as a metaphor. In its metaphorical sense, it could refer to the state of the planet Earth, to its being or to existence itself. Long camera takes, scenes which are designed to show the acting pared down to the essential, dialogues only as necessary and much music show his individual directing style, but often leave the cinema audience puzzled. The Being from Earth differs strongly from the conventional view of cinema.

The Being from Earth, just like the short film Ginger Hel, is an extremely enigmatic film. It asks the question Why again and again, but very rarely comes up with an answer. The viewer's expectation of finding a clarifying, conventional narrative structure quickly gives way to the search for insight. But even this is difficult to find. Various interpretations of the action are possible and it is probably meant to be that way. The film develops its own obscure dynamic. The Being from Earth appears to invite the viewer to let themselves drift and to recognise perfection in life and in film as an impossible idea. The being in the film is extremely passive. It does not bite, or kill. In character it can be compared with the creature in Eraserhead by David Lynch. After the premiere on December, 8, 1991 in the Kino Babylon  in Berlin, Lars Olav Beier wrote a review of The Being from Earth in the magazine Tip Berlin number 25 / 1991.

In 1992 the documentary Vostell 60 – Rückblick 92 (Vostell 60 – Review 92) about Wolf Vostell's retrospective in Cologne was created under his artistic direction. In 1995 he worked on a series of drawings, sketching his cinematic visions, which led to the publication of the Sketchbook 95 / 96 and Sketchbook 97 / 98. After Wolf Vostell's death in 1998, David Vostell took responsibility for his father's legacy. From 1998 until 2001 he organised the Wolf Vostell Archive and gave it a chronological order.

Since 2002 David Vostell has worked as a composer in Spain. In 2003 he created the Symphony Nº 1 and in 2004 the Symphony Nº 2. In 2005 he composed Formulas of Life. 24 suites associated with 24 key words, such as birth, love and dream. The digital booklet accompanying the CD shows all 24 words as digitally visualised photomontages which are linked to his compositions.

In 2006 David Vostell composed The Universe is Music. The soundtrack for the video sequences of faraway galaxies transmitted by the Hubble Space Telescope. The digital booklet accompanying the CD shows 26 digital photomontages, visualising travel in time and the search for alien life forms in the universe in a concrete way. In 2012 he composed the music for Iris Brosch´s video In Paradisum.

Photography 
1975: Fandango
1976: Martilandrán, Acehúche, Ceclavin
1976: Creation of a sculpture
1976: Rain
1976: Bundtschuh
1977: The House of the Deaf Man
1978: Wolf Vostell and Salvador Dali in Figueres
1978: Wolf Vostell painting with models
1978: Snowing
1979: Hamlet
1980: Endogen Depression
1981: Fluxus-Train
1981: The Phoenician Women by Euripides
1988: The breakfast of Leonardo da Vinci in Berlin
1991: Automobil-TV-Wedding

Filmography 
1975: Fandango
1976: Holidays 1968–1976
1979: 36574 Images
1979: Familienessen
1980: Endogen Depression
1980: City Travels 1971–1980
1981: Fluxus-Zug
1982: The Portrait
1982: E.d.H.R.
1982: Ginger Hel
1985: Homo Sapiens
1985: Lost in Life
1985: Tutila
1985: She is so nice
1986: Fluxus-Konzert, Madrid
1986: Die Billard-Mädchen
1986: Die Winde
1986: Cabala Musica
1986: Blue way in
1987: Blood and Cokee
1987: Mythos Berlin
1989: Coma Amazonica
1990: The Being from Earth
1991: Bestia Pigra
1992: Vostell 60 – Review 92

Digital photomontage 
2005: Formulas of Life (24 works)
2006: The Universe is Music (26 works)
2007: Influences (10 works)
2008: EEM / Erotic Enlightenment Mythologies (9 works)
2009: Voyage – human body (7 works)
2010: Serotonin (10 works)
2011: Room (7 works)
2012: My mind (13 works)

Discography 
2003: Symphony Nº 1
2004: Symphony Nº 2
2005: Formulas of Life (24 suites)
2006: The Universe is Music (Soundtrack)
2007: Influences (10 suites)
2008: EEM / Erotic Enlightenment Mythologies (9 suites)
2009: Voyage inside the human body (Soundtrack)
2009: Voyage – human body (7 suites)
2009: Benediction (Soundtrack)
2010: Prélude (Soundtrack)
2010: Serotonin (10 suites)
2011: Room (7 suites)
2012: My mind (13 suites)
2012: In Paradisum  (Soundtrack)
2012: The Goddess of Rain (Soundtrack)
2012: Valentina (Soundtrack)
2013: Woman & Nature near Extinction (Soundtrack)
2013: Solid (8 suites)
2014: Lone Ride (6 suites)
2014: Karma-Base, Volume 1 (9 tracks)
2014: Endogen Depression (Soundtrack)
2015: L'Uomo – Documental (Soundtrack)
2015: L'Uomo – Featurette (Soundtrack)
2015: L'Uomo (Soundtrack)
2015: Vita (Soundtrack)
2015: Cruising at night (Soundtrack)
2015: Beautiful Earth (Soundtrack)
2015: Biest (3 tracks)
2016: Curse (3 tracks)
2016: How Sweet It Is To Love (Soundtrack)
2017: For you (Soundtrack)
2017: Vita II (Soundtrack)
2017: Revenge (3 tracks)
2018: Ease (3 tracks)
2019: Shine (3 tracks)
2020: Glow44 (3 tracks)

Other releases 
 1982: Triptychon, 6 tracks with Mark Eins and Ziggy Schöning (on MC)
 1985: Work on Video by David Vostell (on VHS)
 1992: My Intuitive Video 1979–1989 (on VHS)
 1992: The Being from Earth (on VHS)
 1992: Ginger Hel (on VHS)
 1992: Vostell 60 – Review 92 (on VHS)
 1996: Michaela Nolte, David Vostell, Sketchbook 95 / 96
 1998: David Vostell, Sketchbook 97 / 98
 2007: Vostell 60 – Review 92 (on DVD)
 2012: David Vostell, Suites y collages fotográficos digitales 2005–2012 (MP3 on CD)
 2013: David Vostell, short films, music videos, documentaries 1979–1992 (on USB flash drive)
 2014: The World of David Vostell. Short films, music videos, documentaries, music, and more 1979–2014 (on USB flash drive)
 2016: Wolf Vostell, Seismograph seiner Epoche, Werke 1952–1998, LB Publication, Editor David Vostell, The Wolf Vostell Estate
 2016: The World of David Vostell. Short films, music videos, documentaries, music, and more 1976–2016, Special Edition (on USB flash drive)
 2018: Mercedes Guardado, La historia del Museo Vostell Malpartida, LB Publication, Editor David Vostell, The Wolf Vostell Estate, .
 2018: Iris Brosch, Trilogy – A Warning for the 21st Century, Editions du Temple (on DVD and Blu-ray)
 2018: Trilogy – A Warning for the 21st Century, Sagen, Soundtrack (on USB flash drive)
 2019: The World of David Vostell 1976–2018, Sun Chariot Books, Cáceres 2019, .
 2020: Queridísima. Mercedes Guardado y Wolf Vostell, LB Publication, Editor David Vostell, The Wolf Vostell Estate, Cáceres 2020, .
 2020: The World of David Vostell. Short films, music videos, documentaries, music, and more 1976–2020, Limited Edition (on USB flash drive)
 2022: The Being from Earth. Blu-ray, nine disc, Limited Edition of 100, 9 exclusive double-sided Art Cards. Extra content on USB Flash Drive.
 2022: The Being from Earth. Blu-ray, Illuminated Nebula.

Bibliography 
 Shakespeare Hamlet Heyme / Vostell. Schauspiel Köln. Hansgünther Heyme, photos Stefan Odry, David Vostell, Druck und Verlagshaus Wienand, Köln 1979.
 Die Phoenizierinnen des Euripides. Württembergische Staatstheater Stuttgart. Hansgünther Heyme, Fotos David Vostell, Stuttgarter Hefte 28, Druckhaus Münster, Stuttgart 1981.
 Hansgünther Heyme, Wolf Vostell, Hamlet / Phönizierinnen. Inszenierungsdokumentation. Photos Stefan Odry, David Vostell, Württembergische Staatstheater Stuttgart, Druckhaus Münster, Stuttgart 1982.
 TIP Berlin Magazin, Nr.25 / 1991, Bericht von Lars Olav Beier, The Being from Earth.
   Anja Oßwald: Steiner Art Tapes. Ars Nicolai, Berlin 1994, .
 Filmjahrbuch 1995, von Lothar R. Just, Heyne Verlag. .
 Fischer Film Almanach 1995, Fischer Verlag. .
 Das Heyne-Lexikon des Science-Fiction-Films von Ronald M. Hahn und Volker Jansen. Heyne, München 1994. .
 Michaela Nolte: David Vostell, Sketchbook 95 / 96, Berlin 1996.
 David Vostell, Sketchbook 97 / 98, Berlin 1998.
 David Vostell Biografie / Recopilation 1978–2008 von Michaela Nolte, nivel88 Verlag. .

External links 
 
 David Vostell at Discogs
 Writing about David Vostell
 Videos: 1979–2017
 Archive at tumblr, 2019
 Video: In Paradisum, 2012

References 

1960 births
Living people
Film people from Cologne
German classical composers
German male classical composers
German film score composers
Male film score composers
21st-century classical composers
21st-century German composers
21st-century German male musicians